"We Are Coming, Father Abra'am", is a poem written by James S. Gibbons, set to music by eight different composers, including Stephen Foster. William Cullen Bryant published one version (with music by Luther Orlando Emerson (1820–1915). Bryant's newspaper originally published the poem and, because it was originally published anonymously, many assumed it was his, and it was widely republished, so Bryant issued a statement denying his authorship. The poem and music came in response to a call by Abraham Lincoln on July 1, 1862 for volunteers to fight for the U.S. in the American Civil War.

Lyrics

Song of the Conscripts
A parody of the song, titled Song of the Conscripts, expressed resentment against the 1863 Enrollment Act and particularly its provision for escaping conscription by paying a $300 commutation fee, which only the rich could afford. One verse ran:

These lyrics were printed in the New York Copperhead, and copies were distributed at the New York City draft riots.

References

External links

 "We Are Coming, Father Abra'am" at Project Gutenberg
 

American poems
Songs of the American Civil War
1860s songs
Songs based on poems